Jacques Alfred Dextraze  (August 15, 1919 – May 9, 1993) was a Canadian military officer who served as Chief of the Defence Staff of Canada from 1972–1977.

Early life
Born in Montreal, Quebec, the son of Alfred Dextraze and Amanda (Bond) Dextraze, he joined Les Fusiliers Mont-Royal in 1940 as a Private, and was soon commissioned as Lieutenant.

Military career
He served in World War II in North West Europe where he was granted command of his regiment in action and was awarded two Distinguished Service Orders. In 1950 he was called back from a civilian career to build, train and command the 2nd Battalion, Royal 22e Régiment, leading it in the Korean War. His battalion won considerable acclaim for its stubborn stand at "Hill 355" when allied troops withdrew, leaving the "Vingt deux" surrounded but unshaken.

In 1962 he was promoted to the rank of Brigadier General.

In 1963 he was the first Canadian to be Chief of Staff of the United Nations Operation in the Congo in Congo (Léopoldville).
The military component headquarters, coordinated by Dextraze, was in the process of planning the mission's withdrawal in early 1964 as the Simba rebellion loomed. Dextraze launched a small-scale operation during Pierre Mulele's Kwilu Province uprising of January 1964 in order to save at least some of the threatened aid workers and missionaries under attack from the jeunesse.

He also led missions to rescue a group of Non Governmental Organization personnel, who were hostages of Katangan rebels in the Congo. He was awarded the Commander of the Order of the British Empire for his service. He was one of Canada's most distinguished peacekeeping commanders.

In 1967 he was promoted to Major General and Lieutenant-General in 1968. In 1972, he was promoted to the rank of General and became Chief of Defence Staff of the Canadian Forces for an unusual period of five years.

Civilian career
He retired from the Canadian Forces in 1977 and from 1977 to 1982 was Chairman of the Canadian National Railway.

Honours
In 1978 he was made a Companion of the Order of Canada. 

Dextraze Pavilion, a dining hall at the Royal Military College Saint-Jean was named in his honour.

The General J. A. Dextraze Fitness Center at Canadian Forces College in Toronto is likewise dedicated to him.

Family
In 1942, he married Frances Helena Pare. They had four sons; Richard, Jacques, Robert and John.

His son, Richard Paul Dextraze, was Killed In Action (KIA) in Vietnam on April 23, 1969, where he fought as a Lance Corporal in the United States Marine Corps, and was a posthumous recipient of the Silver Star medal and the Purple Heart. He is interred along with his father in Notre Dame des Neiges Cemetery in Montreal, Quebec.

Notes

References

Further reading

External links 

 Canada's 25 Most Renowned Military Leaders

1919 births
1993 deaths
Military personnel from Montreal
People from Montreal
Chiefs of the Defence Staff (Canada)
Canadian generals
Canadian military personnel of the Korean War
Canadian Commanders of the Order of the British Empire
Companions of the Order of Canada
Canadian Army personnel of World War II
People of the Congo Crisis
Canadian Companions of the Distinguished Service Order
Burials at Notre Dame des Neiges Cemetery
Fusiliers Mont-Royal
Les Fusiliers Mont-Royal officers
Royal 22nd Regiment
Royal 22nd Regiment officers